Raymond Lefèvre (20 November 1929 – 27 June 2008) was a French easy listening orchestra leader, arranger and composer.

Biography and career 
Born on 20 November 1929 in Calais, France, Raymond Lefèvre is best known for his interpretation of the 1968 theme "Soul Coaxing (Ame Caline)" (composed by Michel Polnareff), which became an international hit. He also wrote soundtracks for movies with Louis de Funès such as La Soupe Aux Choux (1981) or the series Le Gendarme de Saint Tropez. During the late 1950s and early 1960s, he accompanied Dalida on most of her recordings (Bambino, Por Favor, Tu peux tout faire de moi, Quand on n'a que l'amour), amongst many others. He started his musical career in 1956 on the Barclay Records label. His recordings were released in the United States on the Kapp and Four Corners record labels until 1969.

Early career 
He was accepted at the Paris Conservatory when 17 years old. During the early 1950s he played the piano for the Franck Pourcel orchestra. In 1953 he played the piano at the Hilton Hotel in Los Angeles. He started his musical career in 1956 on the Barclay label and recorded his debut album that year.

He worked on the French television programmes Musicorama (1950s) and Palmarés des Chansons (1965, 1966, 1967) accompanying such famous artists as Dalida, Claude François, Richard Anthony, with his own orchestra.

His recording of "The Day the Rains Came" was a best seller in the United States in 1958. The song "Ame câline" (Soul Coaxing) became an international hit in 1968 and "La La La (He Gives Me Love)" - an instrumental adaptation of 1968's Eurovision Song Contest's winning song by Spanish singer Massiel - was a minor hit in 1968 in Canada and the United States. In 1969, his recording of "La Reine de Saba" (Queen of Sheba) became a big hit in Japan. From 1972 until the early 2000s, he undertook several successful tours of Japan.

He worked on the soundtracks of many Louis de Funès movies.

Eurovision 
Lefèvre conducted entries four times at the Eurovision Song Contest, three times for Monaco (in 1961, 1962, and 1963), and once for Luxembourg in 1970.

Death 
Raymond Lefèvre died in Seine-Port, France on 27 June 2008 at the age of 78.

Discography

Film music (excerpt) 
 1957 - Fric-frac en dentelles with Peter van Eyck.
 1964 - Le gendarme de St. Tropez
 1965 - Le gendarme à New York (with Paul Mauriat)
 1967 - Les grandes vacances
 1968 - Le gendarme se marie
 1970 - Le gendarme en balade
 1979 - Le gendarme et les extra-terrestres
 1981 - La soupe aux choux
 1982 - Le gendarme et les gendarmettes

Records 
 1965 - Palmares des chansons
 1966 - Palmares des chansons No.2
 1967 - Palmares des chansons No.3
 1967 - Palmares des chansons No.4
 1967 - Raymond Lefevre No.5
 1968 - Raymond Lefèvre No.6
 1968 - Raymond Lefèvre No.7
 1968 - Joyeux Noels
 1968 - Christmas Symphonies
 1968 - Palmares des chansons
 1968 - Raymond Lefèvre No.9
 1969 - Raymond Lefèvre No.10
 1969 - Musique de films
 1969 - Great Strauss Waltzes
 1969 - Raymond Lefèvre Plays the Hits
 1970 - Raymond Lefèvre No.12
 1970 - Concerto pour une voix
 1971 - Raymond Lefèvre No.13
 1971 - Soul Symphonies
 1971 - This is Raymond Lefèvre
 1971 - Golden Prize
 1972 - Raymond Lefèvre No.14
 1972 - Raymond Lefèvre No.15
 1972 - Raymond Lefèvre No.16
 1972 - Live in Japan
 1972 - Oh Happy Day
 1972 - Mamy Blue
 1973 - Festival de Sanremo 1973
 1973 - Soul Symphonies No.2
 1973 - Raymond Lefèvre No.17
 1974 - Raymond Lefèvre No.18
 1974 - Raymond Lefèvre No.19
 1974 - Live in Japan 1974
 1974 - Best of Raymond Lefèvre
 1975 - Stereo Laboratory Vol. 10 Strings
 1975 - Emmanuelle Golden Prize
 1975 - Raymond Lefèvre No.20
 1976 - Raymond Lefèvre No.21
 1976 - French Love in Hi-Fi
 1976 - Les plus grands succes 76
 1976 - Love Symphonies
 1976 - 16 musiques de films
 1977 - Rock and Rhythm in Hi-Fi
 1977 - Love in Stereo No.1
 1977 - Live in Japan 1977
 1977 - El nuevo sonido de Raymond Lefèvre
 1977 - Eux
 1978 - Festival des meilleurs musiques des films
 1978 - Soul Symphonies No.3
 1978 - Holiday Symphonies
 1978 - Grandi temi da film
 1978 - Film Symphonies
 1978 - Romance
 1979 - Live in Japan 1978
 1979 - Tomorrow's Symphonies du Futur
 1979 - Disco Symphonies
 1979 - Pop Symphonies
 1979 - Love World
 1980 - Concerto
 1980 - The Best of Raymond Lefèvre
 1980 - 16 grands succes
 1981 - Suite latine
 1982 - Demonstration
 1982 - Operamania
 1983 - Digital Parade
 1984 - Lefèvre Meets Chiharu
 1984 - Les plus grands succes de Julio Iglesias
 1984 - Live in Japan 1984
 1984 - Plays Chinese Songs
 1986 - Back to Bach
 1988 - Music of the Night
 1988 - Les plus grands succes de Raymond Lefèvre Vol. 3
 1989 - Mull of Kintyre
 1991 - Canzone
 1993 - Sous le ciel de Paris
 1993 - Les plus grands succes de Raymond Lefèvre Vol. 5
 1995 - Plein soleil
 1995 - Autumnal Player (When Richard Meets Raymond)
 1995 - Japon mon amour (with Richard Clayderman)
 1998 - Lacrima cristi
 2002 - De temps en temps
 2009 - Raymond Lefèvre et son Grand Orchestre
 2010 - A mon pere

References

External links 

soundtrack-record listing
news of his death
Myriades on the Internet - Japanese Fan Club
Raymond Lefevre at Grand Orchestras
Grand Orchestra - the best orchestras of the world!

1929 births
2008 deaths
Easy listening musicians
French film score composers
Eurovision Song Contest conductors
Monument Records artists
Dalida
Burials at Père Lachaise Cemetery
20th-century conductors (music)
French male film score composers
20th-century French male musicians